Asian youth bests in the sport of athletics are ratified by the Asian Athletics Association (AAA). They are the all-time best marks set in competition by athletes aged 17 or younger throughout the entire calendar year of the performance and competing for a member nation of the Asian Athletics Association. The AAA maintains a list of youth bests only in a specific list of outdoor events. All other records, including all indoor records, shown on this list are tracked by statisticians not officially sanctioned by the governing body.

Outdoor

Key:

Boys

Girls

Indoor
The AAA does not keep official youth bests in indoor events.

Boys

Girls

Notes

References
General
Asian Records & Best Performances 30 July 2022 updated
Specific

Youth
Asian